Super Hits is a budget priced compilation album from country music group Shenandoah.

Super Hits was certified Gold by the RIAA for sales of 500,000 copies.

Track listing

Release history

Critical reception

Super Hits received three and a half stars out of five from Stephen Thomas Erlewine of Allmusic. Erlewine concludes that the album is "a good bargain for the budget-conscious.".

Chart performance
Super Hits peaked at #65 on the U.S. Billboard Top Country Albums chart the week of January 28, 1995.

References

Shenandoah (band) albums
1994 greatest hits albums
Columbia Records compilation albums